The Republic of Korea participated in the 2010 Asian Games in Guangzhou, China on 12–27 November 2010.

Medal summary

Medal table

Medalists

Gold medal

Silver medal

Bronze medal

Archery

Men

Women

Athletics

Men

Track events

Road events

Field events

Combined events

Women 

Track events

Road events

Field events

Combined events

Badminton

Men

Women

Mixed

Beach volleyball

Men

Women

Baseball

Men

Pitchers : Ahn Ji-Man, Bong Jung-Keun, Chong Tae-Hyon, Im Tae-Hoon, Ko Chang-Sung, Kim Myung-Sung, Ryu Hyun-Jin, Song Eun-Beom, Yang Hyeon-Jong, Yoon Suk-Min
Catchers : Kang Min-Ho, Park Kyung-Oan
Infielders : Cho Dong-Chan, Choi Jeong, Jeong Keun-Woo, Kang Jung-Ho, Kim Tae-Kyun, Lee Dae-Ho, Son Si-Hyun
Outfielders : Choo Shin-Soo, Kim Hyun-Soo, Kim Kang-Min, Lee Jong-Wook, Lee Yong-Kyu
Manager : Cho Beom-Hyeon
Coaches : Cho Chung-Hee, Kim Joon-Bae, Kim Si-Jin, Ryu Joong-Il, Yoon Young-Hwan

Preliminary round

Group B

Semifinals

Gold-medal match

Baseball Roster

Pitchers : Ahn Ji-Man, Bong Jung-Keun, Chong Tae-Hyon, Im Tae-Hoon, Ko Chang-Sung, Kim Myung-Sung, Ryu Hyun-Jin, Song Eun-Beom, Yang Hyeon-Jong, Yoon Suk-Min
Catchers : Kang Min-Ho, Park Kyung-Oan
Infielders : Cho Dong-Chan, Choi Jeong, Jeong Keun-Woo, Kang Jung-Ho, Kim Tae-Kyun, Lee Dae-Ho, Son Si-Hyun
Outfielders : Choo Shin-Soo, Kim Hyun-Soo, Kim Kang-Min, Lee Jong-Wook, Lee Yong-Kyu
Manager : Cho Beom-Hyeon
Coaches : Cho Chung-Hee, Kim Joon-Bae, Kim Si-Jin, Ryu Joong-Il, Yoon Young-Hwan

Basketball

Men
Team
Guard : Park Chan-Hee, Lee Jung-Suk, Yang Dong-Geun
Forward : Lee Kyu-sup, Cho Sung-min, Yang Hee-Jong, Kim Sung-Chul
Center : Kim Joo-Sung, Ha Seung-Jin, Ham Ji-hoon, Lee Seung-Jun, Oh Se-Keun
Coach : Yoo Jae-Hak
Assistant coach : Kim Yoo-Taek

Preliminary round

Group E

Quarterfinals

Semifinals

Gold medal game

Women
Team
Guard : Kim Ji-Yoon, Lee Mi-Sun, Lee Kyung-Eun
Forward : Kim Bo-Mi, Kang A-Jeong, Beon Yeon-Ha, Park Jung-Eun, Kim Dan-Bi
Center : Jung Sun-Hwa, Ha Eun-Joo, Kim Kwe-Ryong, Sin Jung-Ja
Coach : Lim Dal-Sik
Assistant coach : Lee Ho-Keun

Preliminary round

Group A

Semifinals

Gold medal game

Board games

Chess

Go

Bowling

Men

All events

Masters

Boxing

Men

Women

Canoeing

Slarom

Sprint

Cue Sports

Cycling

BMX

Mountain biking

Road

Track
Sprints

Pursuits

Keirin

Point race

Time Trial

Dance Sports

Diving

Men

Women

Dragon boat

Equestrian

Dressage

Eventing

Jumping

Fencing

Men

Women

Football

Men's tournament

Group stage (Group C)

Round of 16

Quarter-finals

Women's tournament

Group stage (Group A)

Golf

Gymnastics

Handball

Field hockey

Judo

Men

Women

Kabaddi

Karate

Modern pentathlon

Roller Sports

Rowing

Rugby

Sailing

Sepaktakraw

Shooting

Soft Tennis

Softball

Squash

Swimming

Men

Women

Table Tennis

Synchronized swimming

Taekwondo

Tennis

Triathlon

Volleyball

Water polo

Group stage (group A)

Quarterfinal

Semifinal

Bronze-medal match

Weightlifting

Wrestling

Wushu

References

Korea, South
2010
Asian Games